The 2021–22 Buffalo Sabres season was the 52nd season for the National Hockey League franchise that was established on May 22, 1970. The Sabres failed to snap their ten-year playoff drought, having last qualified for the playoffs in the 2010–11 season.

The league returned to its normal October-to-April scheduling, a full 82-game regular season which began on October 12, 2021, but this was contingent on the COVID-19 pandemic and the Government of Canada reducing its COVID-19 cross-border travel restrictions. As a result, the Sabres rejoined the Atlantic Division after a one-season stint in the East Division due to realignment under the league's return to play protocols. On April 6, 2022, after the Washington Capitals defeated the Tampa Bay Lightning, the Sabres were eliminated from playoff contention for the 11th straight season, setting an NHL record.

Standings

Divisional standings

Eastern Conference

Schedule and results

Regular season
The regular season schedule was published on July 22, 2021.

Player statistics

Skaters

Goaltenders

†Denotes player spent time with another team before joining the Sabres. Stats reflect time with the Sabres only.
‡Denotes player was traded mid-season. Stats reflect time with the Sabres only.
Bold/italics denotes franchise record.

Awards and honours

Awards

Milestones

Records

Transactions
The Sabres have been involved in the following transactions during the 2021–22 season.

Trades

Players acquired

Players lost

Signings

Draft picks

Below are the Buffalo Sabres selections at the 2021 NHL Entry Draft, which was held on July 23 and 24, 2021, virtually via video conference call from the NHL Network studios in Secaucus, New Jersey, due to the COVID-19 pandemic.

Notes:
 The Philadelphia Flyers' first-round pick went to the Buffalo Sabres as the result of a trade on July 23, 2021, that sent Rasmus Ristolainen to Philadelphia in exchange for Robert Hagg, a second-round pick in 2023 and this pick.
 The Boston Bruins' second-round pick went to the Buffalo Sabres as the result of a trade on April 11, 2021, that sent Taylor Hall and Curtis Lazar to Boston in exchange for Anders Bjork and this pick.
 The Florida Panthers' third-round pick went to the Buffalo Sabres as the result of a trade on April 10, 2021, that sent Brandon Montour to Florida in exchange for this pick.
 The Montreal Canadiens' third and fifth-round picks went to the Buffalo Sabres as the result of a trade on March 26, 2021, that sent Eric Staal to Montreal in exchange for these picks.
 The Colorado Avalanche's sixth-round pick went to the Buffalo Sabres as the result of a trade on March 20, 2021, that sent Jonas Johansson to Colorado in exchange for this pick.

References

2021–22 NHL season by team
Buffalo Sabres seasons
2021 in sports in New York (state)